This is a list of Members of Parliament (MPs) elected in the 1885 general election, held over several days from 24 November 1885 to 18 December 1885.



By-elections
See List of United Kingdom by-elections (1885–1900)

See also
UK general election, 1885
List of parliaments of the United Kingdom

1885
 List
UK MPs
1885 United Kingdom general election